Sandford Spence Schultz (29 August 1857 – 18 December 1937), known in later life as Sandford Spence Storey, was an English cricketer, who played for Cambridge University and Lancashire and played one Test match for England.

Life and career
Schultz was born in Birkenhead, Cheshire, the son of George Edward Schultz and his wife Emma. He was educated at Uppingham and Jesus College, Cambridge.

Although Schultz was only an occasional player in first-class cricket, he was prolific in club cricket and was selected as an amateur in Lord Harris's side that toured Australia in 1878-79, and played in the one Test match of that tour.

Schultz was a fast round-arm bowler and made a lot of runs in club cricket. His Wisden obituary in 1938 recalled a less happy batting experience related in a letter to The Times by a Mr Edmund Peake about a match on the Christchurch ground at Oxford in 1881:

Schultz married Mabel Durrant in 1885. He was a stockbroker, working on the London Exchange for a firm known as Messrs Hedderwick and Schultz. In 1914, around the time of the start of World War I, Schultz changed his Germanic-sounding name to Sandford Spence Storey. He died in Brompton, Kensington, aged 80.

He was the only English Test cricketer with a 'z' in his surname for over a century, until Usman Afzaal played three Tests in 2001.

References

External links
Cricinfo page on Sandford Schultz
CricketArchive page on Sandford Schultz
Brief profile of S.S.Schultz by Don Ambrose

1857 births
1937 deaths
People educated at Uppingham School
Alumni of Jesus College, Cambridge
Cambridge University cricketers
England Test cricketers
English cricketers
Lancashire cricketers
Sportspeople from Birkenhead
Marylebone Cricket Club cricketers
Orleans Club cricketers
Gentlemen of England cricketers
C. I. Thornton's XI cricketers